Alceini is a tribe of deer, containing the extant genus Alces and the extinct genera Cervalces and Libralces. Cervalces and Libralces emerged during the Pliocene while Alces emerged during the Early Pleistocene .

Genera and species
Extant genera
Alces
Extinct genera
†Cervalces
†Libralces

References 

 
Capreolinae
Mammal tribes